Saioa González Villegas is a retired Spanish footballer who played as a defender.

Career
During her career, González played for CE Sabadell and UE L'Estartit before joining Athletic Bilbao, where she was contracted for six seasons (but only played in the first three) before retiring.

González has also played one game with the Spain under-19 national team

Honours
 Copa de la Reina: 2003

References

1984 births
Living people
Spanish women's footballers
Primera División (women) players
UE L'Estartit players
CE Sabadell Femení players
Athletic Club Femenino players
Footballers from Barakaldo
Women's association football defenders
Spain women's youth international footballers
21st-century Spanish women